Synchthonius is a genus of mites.

References 

 Synchthonius at fauna-eu.org

Sarcoptiformes
Acari genera